Frasera coloradensis is a species of flowering plant in the gentian family known by the common names Colorado green gentian, or Colorado gentian, and Colorado frasera. It is endemic to Colorado in the United States, where it is limited to the southeastern corner of the state.

This plant is a perennial herb with branching stems reaching 30 centimeters in height. The leaves have white margins. It is generally monocarpic, living for a few years, producing flowers just once, then dying. The flowers, which are white or greenish with purple dots, appear in June and July.

This plant occurs in Baca, Bent, Las Animas, and Prowers Counties in Colorado. It is mostly limited to the Greenhorn Limestone, a geological formation appearing as limestone outcrops. It may also occur on Graneros shale and Dakota sandstone. The habitat is shortgrass prairie. It may occur with Juniperus monosperma and Haplopappus engelmannii.

Threats to this species include overgrazing, herbicides, and habitat loss and degradation.

References

External links
CalPhotos Photo Gallery

coloradensis
Flora of Colorado